Tony Collard (born 28 July 1961) is a Dutch former professional ice hockey player.

Collard played junior hockey in Canada with the London Knights of the Ontario Hockey Association (OHA). He began his professional career in 1980 with the Heerenveen Flyers, remaining with the team until 1985 when he relocated to Austria to play with Klagenfurter AC until 1989. During this period he also skated in five games with EV Zug in the Swiss National League A.

International
Collard was a long time member of the Netherlands men's national ice hockey team, and he competed with Team Netherlands at the 1981 World Ice Hockey Championships.

References

1961 births
Living people
Dutch expatriate sportspeople in Austria
Dutch expatriate sportspeople in Canada
Dutch expatriate sportspeople in Switzerland
Dutch ice hockey forwards
EC KAC players
EV Zug players
Heerenveen Flyers players
London Knights players
Sportspeople from Utrecht (city)